Sapp may refer to:

People with the name
Sapp (surname)

Politics and organizations
 Locke, Liddell & Sapp, law firm
 Sabah Progressive Party, SAPP, in Malaysian politics
 Southern African Power Pool, SAPP

Other uses
Sapp (instrument), a traditional musical instrument of Punjab
Disodium pyrophosphate, or sodium acid pyrophosphate (SAPP)

See also
Sap (disambiguation)